Crime City Rollers is a women's flat track roller derby league based in Malmö, Sweden.

Established in 2010, the Crime City Rollers comprises one home team and two traveling teams representing the league in competition with other leagues. The Crime City Rollers were accepted as an apprentice league of the Women's Flat Track Derby Association (WFTDA) in July 2011, and became full members of the association in June 2012.

Eleven skaters from Crime City Rollers were selected for Team Sweden at the 2011 Roller Derby World Cup, and one was selected for Team Finland.

WFTDA competition
In 2015, Crime City first qualified for WFTDA Division 1 Playoffs, entering the Dallas tournament as the eighth seed and ultimately finishing in sixth place. In 2016, Crime City returned to Division 1 Playoffs, entering the Columbia tournament as the seventh seed and finishing in sixth place again. In 2017, Crime City hosted a Division 1 Playoff, the first WFTDA Playoff to be held outside of North America. The fourth seed in Malmö, Crime City won their quarterfinal against Helsinki Roller Derby 215-170, qualifying them for WFTDA Championships for the first time. After dropping their semifinal to Gotham Girls Roller Derby 237-65, Crime City also lost the third-place game to London Rollergirls 181-138 and finished in fourth place. Crime City finished outside the medals at Championships in Philadelphia, losing a tight game to Montreal Roller Derby 133-129 and to Arch Rival Roller Derby 220-160.

In 2018, Crime City took second place at the WFTDA Playoff in A Coruña, Spain, losing the title game 342-149 to Arch Rival. At Championships in New Orleans, Crime City again faced Montreal in the opening game of the weekend, and again lost to them by 4 points, this time 184-180. Crime City then rebounded in the consolation round, where they won at Championships for the first time, 173-160 over Jacksonville Roller Derby.

Rankings

 CR = consolation round

Played bouts

References

External links
Crime City Rollers (official website)

Women's Flat Track Derby Association Division 1
Roller derby leagues in Sweden
Roller derby leagues established in 2010
Sport in Malmö
2010 establishments in Sweden